The Mallettown United Methodist Church is a historic church at 274 Mallett Town Road in rural eastern Conway County, Arkansas.  It is located in the hamlet of Mallet Town, at the northwest corner of County Road 54 and Town Circle.  It is a single story masonry structure with a walkout basement, built out of fieldstone and cream-colored brick, both hallmarks of its builder, the regionally prominent African-American stonemason Silas Owens, Sr.  Other elements of his style found on the building include the arched openings of the gabled entry porch.  The church was built in 1947, when Owens's work was beginning reach wider notice in neighboring Faulkner County.

The building was listed on the National Register of Historic Places in 2005.

See also
National Register of Historic Places listings in Conway County, Arkansas

References

United Methodist churches in Arkansas
Churches on the National Register of Historic Places in Arkansas
Churches completed in 1947
Churches in Conway County, Arkansas
National Register of Historic Places in Conway County, Arkansas
1947 establishments in Arkansas